Susan Vaill, ACE, is an American film and television editor, director and producer. She is best known for her work on the television series Hacks, This Is Us, and Grey's Anatomy.

Life and career
Susan was born in Los Angeles. She and her twin sister Sarah Vaill appeared as child actors in 1970s film and television, most notably Sunshine (1973) and Bound For Glory (1976). She studied art history at Williams College and earned her MFA in film production at the USC School of Cinematic Arts. Susan edited 70 episodes of Grey's Anatomy and directed 3 episodes. She is a member of the Directors Guild of America and the American Cinema Editors.

Filmography

Awards and nominations

References

External links
 

Living people
American television editors
American film editors
Year of birth missing (living people)